Hvězda is the Czech word for "star" and may refer to:

 Rudá Hvězda Brno, a defunct sports club
 Rudá Hvězda Cheb, the communistic name for a football club now known as FK Union Cheb
 Letohrádek Hvězda, a villa in Prague

See also 
 Hviezdoslav
 Gwiazdowo (disambiguation)

Czech words and phrases